Tempo of the Damned is the sixth studio album by American thrash metal band Exodus. Released on February 2, 2004 via Nuclear Blast, Tempo of the Damned was Exodus' first studio release since 1992's Force of Habit. It was the last appearance of longtime vocalist Steve "Zetro" Souza until his return for 2014's Blood In, Blood Out as well as the last appearance of founding drummer Tom Hunting until 2007's The Atrocity Exhibition... Exhibit A. The album was also the last studio appearance of guitarist Rick Hunolt until the band's 2021 album Persona Non Grata, where he made a guest appearance.

Tempo of the Damned is the first Exodus studio album to accredit founding guitarist Kirk Hammett for a song ("Impaler").

This album was released two years to the day after the death of former member Paul Baloff.

Although he produced the band's 1997 live album Another Lesson in Violence, this album was the first time Andy Sneap had produced, mixed, engineered or mastered an Exodus studio album; he would provide either role on the band's subsequent albums.

Background 
Tempo of the Damned marked Exodus' first full-length album of new material since 1992's Force of Habit. This is Exodus' first studio album to feature Jack Gibson on bass. This album is also the result of Steve "Zetro" Souza's return to the band, after Exodus reunited with Bonded by Blood-era lead singer Paul Baloff for the release of their live album Another Lesson in Violence in 1997. Baloff died of a stroke in 2002 and Souza was invited back into the band, although this would prove to be the last album to feature him until 2014's Blood In, Blood Out, for he abandoned the group during their tour in South America in support of the album, which resulted in a feud between him and guitarist Gary Holt. Tempo of the Damned was also the last Exodus album to feature longtime guitarist Rick Hunolt. Despite never officially rejoining the band, Hunolt filled in for Holt for European tour in the summer of 2012 due to the latter's commitments with Slayer, and made a guest appearance on their eleventh studio Persona Non Grata (2021). Although this album was also the last to feature drummer Tom Hunting before his second departure, he would later rejoin the band in 2007. Souza would rejoin Exodus as well after his replacement Rob Dukes was fired from the band in 2014.

Tempo of the Damned also marks Exodus' only studio album to contain a song credited to founding member Kirk Hammett, who found greater recognition as a member of Metallica. The others are their 1982 Demo cassette and the 1997 live release, Another Lesson in Violence; the latter featured the song "Impaler". Hammett brought one of "Impaler"'s riffs to the Metallica song "Trapped Under Ice", which was released on their  1984 album Ride the Lightning. Music videos were filmed for the songs "War is my Shepherd" and "Throwing Down," which largely consists of a jam performance.

Reception 

Tempo of the Damned received a positive review from AllMusic's Eduardo Rivadavia, who awarded the album three stars out of five, saying "all of the much loved Exodus hallmarks are here: lyrics filled with biting, sarcastic social commentary: no-fuss, jagged thrash metal; and unparalleled technical precision." He then finished his review by saying that the album "successfully resurrects Exodus as the potent and formidable thrash machine of old."

Tempo of the Damned sold almost 2,600 copies in its first week of release in the U.S. and over 14,300 copies by September 13, 2004 in the U.S.

Track listing 
All songs written by Gary Holt except where noted.

Personnel 
 Steve "Zetro" Souza – vocals
 Gary Holt – guitars
 Rick Hunolt – guitars
 Jack Gibson – bass
 Tom Hunting – drums

Production
 Produced, engineered, mixed and mastered by Andy Sneap
 Mixed at Backstage Studio Derby UK
 Recorded at Tsunami Recordings, Moss Beach, California (except Drums Recorded at Prairie Sun Studio, Cotati, California)
 Cover Artwork by Jowita Kaminska

Charts

References 

Exodus (American band) albums
2004 albums
Nuclear Blast albums
Albums produced by Andy Sneap